Rhinella lindae is a species of toad in the family Bufonidae. It is endemic to Colombia and known from its type locality, Murri in the municipality of Frontino, and from Las Orquídeas National Natural Park, both on the western slope of the Cordillera Occidental, Antioquia Department. The specific name lindae honors , an American herpetologist. However, common name Murri beaked toad has been coined for this species.

Description
The holotype, an adult female, measures , whereas the paratype male—of unknown maturity status—measures  in snout–vent length. The snout is long and acuminate. In the female, tympanic annulus is present but the tympanic membrane is poorly differentiated; in the male, no tympanic annulus is present. The parotoid glands are ovoid but depressed and not very conspicuous. Dorsal skin is studded with minute granules extending to eyelids that show a crest. The fingers are one quarter webbed whereas the toes are extensively webbed. The upper parts are opaque black to dark brown with light yellow or olive green spots and dots. The venter is yellow or olive green with brown or black spots. The eye is coffee-colored.

Habitat and conservation
Individuals have been found in leaf litter and perching on rocks and in low vegetation. Reproduction is unknown.

It is a rare species that is threatened by habitat loss caused by agriculture, livestock, and illegal mining. The Las Orquídeas National Park site is subject to logging.

References 

lindae
Amphibians of the Andes
Amphibians of Colombia
Endemic fauna of Colombia
Taxa named by Juan A. Rivero
Amphibians described in 1990
Taxonomy articles created by Polbot
Fauna of the northwestern Andean montane forests